A satchel charge is a demolition device, primarily intended for combat, whose primary components are a charge of dynamite or a more potent explosive such as C-4 plastic explosive, a carrying device functionally similar to a satchel or messenger bag, and a triggering mechanism; the term covers both improvised and formally designed devices.

In World War II, combat engineers used satchel charges to demolish heavy stationary targets such as rails, obstacles, blockhouses, bunkers, caves, and bridges. The   World War II–era United States Army M37 Demolition Kit contained eight blocks of high explosive, with two priming assemblies, in a canvas bag with a shoulder strap. Part or all of this charge could be placed against a structure or slung into an opening. It was usually detonated with a pull igniter. When used as an anti-tank weapon, charges were sufficient to severely damage the tracks.  charges were enough to destroy medium tanks.

Later in the Vietnam War, Vietcong and North Vietnamese soldiers assigned elite sappers to stealthily penetrate defenses of sites controlled by enemy forces. Often, this meant using satchel charges as well as Bangalore torpedoes to blast through barbed wire entanglements, minefields, structures, and other fortifications. The later U.S. M183 Demolition Charge Assembly contained  of C-4 in each satchel, and could be used with a timed fuse. In the Second Battle of Fallujah in Iraq, U.S. M2 20 lb assault demolitions were used to collapse houses being used as fighting positions by insurgents.

Some special forces may use customized satchel charges designed to destroy their specific mission's target.

See also
Door breaching
Petard

References

Explosive weapons
Anti-fortification weapons
World War II infantry weapons of the United States
World War II infantry weapons of the United Kingdom
Anti-tank weapons
Finnish inventions
Weapons of the Philippine Army